Clouds of Sils Maria (known simply as Sils Maria in some territories) is a 2014 psychological drama film written and directed by Olivier Assayas, and starring Juliette Binoche, Kristen Stewart, and Chloë Grace Moretz. The film is a French-German-Swiss co-production. Principal photography took place from August to October 2013, with most of the filming taking place in Sils Maria, Switzerland. The film follows an established middle-aged actress (Binoche) who is cast as the older lover in a romantic lesbian drama opposite an upstart young starlet (Moretz). She is overcome with personal insecurities and professional jealousies—all while sexual tension simmers between her and her personal assistant (Stewart). The screenplay was written with Binoche in mind and incorporates elements from her life into the plot.

Clouds of Sils Maria was selected to compete for the Palme d'Or in the main competition section at the 2014 Cannes Film Festival on 23 May 2014, and also screened at the Toronto International Film Festival and New York Film Festival. The film received positive reviews, with critics lauding the work as psychologically complex and praising the lead actresses' performances. It won the Louis Delluc Prize for Best Film in December 2014, and received six César Award nominations. Stewart received the César Award for Best Supporting Actress in February 2015, the first time an American won the award.

Plot
Maria Enders is an international film and stage actress. She travels with a loyal and young American assistant, Valentine. Twenty years earlier, Maria got her big break when she was cast and successfully performed as a young girl Sigrid in both the play and film version of Maloja Snake by Wilhelm Melchior, a Swiss playwright who is now elderly. The play centers on the tempestuous relationship between Sigrid and Helena, a vulnerable older woman. Helena commits suicide after Sigrid takes advantage of her and dumps her.

While traveling to Zürich to accept an award on behalf of Wilhelm, and planning to visit him at home the following day at his house in Sils Maria—a remote settlement in the Alps—Maria learns of his death. His widow Rosa later confides that Wilhelm had ended his life and had been terminally ill. During the awards ceremony, Maria is approached by Klaus Diesterweg, a popular theater director. He wants to persuade her to appear onstage in a revival of Maloja Snake, but this time in the role of Helena.

Maria is torn and reluctantly accepts. To prepare for the role, she accepts Rosa's offer to stay at the Melchiors' house in Sils Maria. Rosa is leaving to escape her memories of Wilhelm. Maria's discussions with Valentine and their read-throughs of the play's scenes evoke uncertainty about the nature of their relationship. A young American actress, 19-year-old Jo-Ann Ellis, has been chosen to portray the role of Sigrid. Researching her on Google and the Internet, Valentine tells Maria, who is out of touch with social media, that Ellis has been involved in numerous scandals.

Questions soon multiply regarding aging, time, culture and the blurring line between the Sigrid/Helena and the Valentine/Maria relationships. Maria and Jo-Ann finally meet, but their relationship is complicated. Jo-Ann appears to be implicated in the attempted suicide of the ex-wife of her new boyfriend.

During their time at Sils Maria, Maria and Valentine spend much of their days hiking in the Alps. On one such final outing, they hike to the Maloja Pass to observe the Maloja Snake (both the "Maloja Snake" of the play's title and the "Clouds of Sils Maria" in the film's title). When discussing the play’s ending, in which Helena walks into the mountains never to return, Valentine suggests that Helena can still be alive and walk away to start a new life. Maria protests that Helena must be dead because she doesn’t return. After suggesting that their approaches to the play are too different for her (Valentine) to be a useful assistant, Valentine disappears without explanation.

A few weeks later, a young filmmaker who has previously sent a script to Maria visits her by appointment five minutes before the curtain rises on the opening night of Maloja Snake in London. Maria seems preoccupied, being so close to the start of the performance, and dismisses his suggested ideas about the proposed film role he is offering her as "too abstract for me". When she says the role he has written is too young for her and would suit Jo-Ann better, he suggests that the character is ageless and that he does not relate to his era with its Internet scandals and trashy values. Maria does not give him a reply as to whether she will take part in the film. She then appears onstage, smoking and waiting for Sigrid.

Cast

Production
Principal photography of Clouds of Sils Maria began on 22 August 2013 and ended on 4 October. The film was shot on location in the titular village of Sils Maria, Switzerland as well as Zürich; Leipzig, Germany; and South Tyrol, Italy.

In an interview, Assayas said that all the film's interiors were shot in Germany. The production moved to Sils Maria to film the hiking scenes, and moved again to film the scenes in and around the chalet in South Tyrol.

The Chanel company debuted in film financing with this production. In addition it supplied the actresses with clothes, jewelry, accessories, and makeup, and the brand was scripted in as a provider of the same to Maria.  Chanel provided some of the budget to allow Olivier Assayas to fulfill his dream of shooting a film on 35-mm film instead of digitally.

Assayas has described the fictional play Maloja Snake as a "condensed, brutalized version" of The Bitter Tears of Petra von Kant, a play by Rainer Werner Fassbinder (it was later adapted as a film of the same name).

The American title of the film is Clouds of Sils Maria. In France the film was released as Sils Maria, Assayas' original name.

Release

Marketing
The first trailer for the film was released on 22 May 2014. Another international trailer followed on 7 July.

Film festivals
The film was selected to compete for the Palme d'Or in the main competition section at the 2014 Cannes Film Festival on 23 May 2014. It also screened at the Toronto International Film Festival and New York Film Festival.

Reception

Critical response

On review aggregator Rotten Tomatoes, 91% of 179 critics have given the film a positive review, with an average rating of 7.6/10. The website's critics consensus reads: "Bolstered by a trio of powerful performances from its talented leads, Clouds of Sils Maria is an absorbing, richly detailed drama with impressive depth and intelligence." On Metacritic, the film has a weighted average score of 79 out of 100, based on 41 reviews from critics, indicating "generally favorable reviews".

Clouds of Sils Maria premiered at the Cannes Film Festival to positive reviews. Robbie Collin of The Daily Telegraph stated, "This is a complex, bewitching and melancholy drama, another fearlessly intelligent film from Assayas." He said, "Binoche plays the role with elegance and melancholic wit – her character slips between fiction and fact in a way that recalls her role in Abbas Kiarostami's Certified Copy. But it's Stewart who really shines here. Valentine is probably her best role to date: she's sharp and subtle, knowable and then suddenly distant, and a late, surprising twist is handled with a brilliant lightness of touch."

Peter Debruge of Variety said it was Assayas' "daring rejoinder, a multi-layered, femme-driven meta-fiction that pushes all involved—including next-gen starlets Kristen Stewart and Chloë Grace Moretz — to new heights." Matt Risley of Total Film called it "an elegant, intelligent drama, enlivened by strong performances by Binoche, Moretz and especially Stewart, for whom this will surely usher in a new dawn."

Stephanie Zacharek of The Village Voice wrote: "But the movie's true center, the meteorological phenomenon that makes it so pleasurable to watch, is the half-prickly, half-affectionate interplay between Binoche and Stewart." Ben Sachs of Chicago Reader wrote: "This recalls Ingmar Bergman's chamber dramas in the intensity and psychological complexity of the central relationship, yet the filmmaking is breathtakingly fluid, evoking a sense of romantic abandon."

However, Kyle Smith of the New York Post writes: "A backstage drama that has all the sizzle of a glass of water resting on the windowsill, [...] Clouds of Sils Maria mistakes lack of dramatic imagination for smoldering subtlety." Richard Brody from The New Yorker writes: "Clouds of Sils Maria, as the title suggests, is a sort of travelogue, a commercial for European cultural tourism, and, as such, it's the perfect image of the very system that created it. There's almost no independent filmmaking in France, and there isn't supposed to be. If there were, it would stand as a threat to the system that, by way of training, enticements, and restrictions, is the source of the comforts that the movie depicts and that the movie reflects. The mediocrity is stifling."

Box office
Clouds of Sils Maria opened in France on 20 August 2014 in 150 theaters for a $3,663 per theater average and a box office total of $549,426 as of 24 August 2014. The film expanded to 195 theaters in its second week of release, and the box office increased to an estimated $1,150,090.

Clouds of Sils Maria opened in the United States on 10 April 2015 in three theaters and grossed $69,729 on its opening weekend for an average of $23,243 per. As of 4 June 2015, the film has grossed an estimated $1,743,577 after expanding theaters.

Awards and nominations
The film won the Louis Delluc Prize for Best Film in December 2014. The film received six César Award nominations including best film, best director, best actress, best original screenplay, and best cinematography, while Stewart won for best supporting actress, becoming the first American actress to win a César and the third  American actor to win after Adrien Brody in 2003 and Christopher Lambert in 1985.

Soundtrack
 "Kowalski" by Primal Scream
 "Largo de Xerxes" – Georg Friedrich Handel
 "Canon and Gigue in D Major for 3 Violins and Basso Continuo" – Johann Pachelbel
 "Paavin of Albarti (Alberti)" – Innocentio Alberti (performed by Hesperion XXI)
 "Sonata No. 2 in D Minor" – Georg Friedrich Handel
 "Sonata No. 2 in B-Flat Major for Violin and Harp, Op. 16: II. Adagio" - Louis Spohr
 "Trio for Violin, Cello and Harp in E minor: III. Rondo" - Louis Spohr

Home media
The film was released on DVD and Digital HD by Paramount Home Media on July 14, 2015; the company also handles the digital entertainment sales, with IFC handling the video on demand sales.

The Criterion Collection released a DVD and Blu-ray edition on 28 June 2016.

References

External links
  (international)
  (France)
  (United States)
 
 
 
 
iClouds of Sils Maria an essay by Molly Haskell at the Criterion Collection

2014 drama films
2014 films
2010s English-language films
English-language French films
English-language German films
English-language Swiss films
Films about actors
Films directed by Olivier Assayas
Films featuring a Best Supporting Actress César Award-winning performance
Films set in the Alps
Films set in London
Films set in Zürich
Films shot in Berlin
Films shot in Italy
Films shot in Zürich
Films with screenplays by Olivier Assayas
French drama films
German drama films
Louis Delluc Prize winners
Swiss drama films
2010s French films
2010s German films